Göran Aijmer (born 1936) is a Swedish social anthropologist.

Works
Works by Göran Aijmer include:
 
 
 
 
 

1936 births
Living people
Swedish anthropologists
Social anthropologists